Gowri is an Indian feminine given name that may refer to the following notable people:
Gowri Ishwaran, Indian educationist
Gowri Kirubanandan, Tamil writer 
Gowri Koneswaran, Tamil-American poet and performing artist
Gowri Krishnan, Indian television actress
Gowri MN (born 1989), Indian sand artist 
Gowri Lakshmi Bayi (1791–1815), Indian royalty
Gowri Munjal, Indian actress and model
Gowri Nandha, Indian actress
Gowri Parvati Bayi (1802–1853), Indian royalty
Gowri Rukmini Bayi, 19th century Indian princess